Pokémon involves catching and training of fictional creatures called "Pokémon" and using them to battle other Trainer's pokémon. Each successive generation of games builds upon this concept by introducing new Pokémon items, and gameplay concepts.

Game structure 
Each game in the Pokémon series takes place in a fictional region of the Pokémon world, typically based on a real-world location, and begins with the player receiving a starter Pokémon, usually from that region's Pokémon Professor. Players have the option to choose one of three different types of Pokémon: a Grass type, a Fire type, and a Water type, though many starter Pokémon gain an additional type upon evolution. Many games include a rival character, who receives the Pokémon whose type is advantageous against the player's starter Pokémon. By traveling around the region, catching and evolving Pokémon, and defeating other Trainers in battle, the player increases the size and strength of their Pokémon collection. A major subplot of most games is to defeat a criminal organization, whose intents are usually trying to take over the world through the misuse of the game's legendary Pokémon.

Various facilities can be found throughout the Pokémon world such as Pokémon Centers, Poké Marts, and in Pokémon Sun and Moon, some trial locations and Gyms. At a Pokémon Center, the player can have their Pokémon healed for free and access the PC, where players can organize their collection of Pokémon, store and withdraw items, and have their Pokédex rated. Before X and Y, this is also where players can link up with other game cartridges or cards to battle or trade with other players. Poké Marts are shops where players can buy items with the money they win during battles; certain cities may have specialized shops, like a pharmacy or a department store. Periodically, a town will contain a Pokémon Gym, which houses a powerful Trainer known as a Gym Leader that functions as a boss. Victory against them grants the player a Gym Badge; after collecting eight Gym Badges, the player may challenge the region's Elite Four and Champion (in Pokémon Sword and Shield, the Elite Four is replaced by the Champion Cup, a single-elimination tournament that determines who gets the right to challenge the Champion). Gyms are absent in Sun, Moon, Ultra Sun, and Ultra Moon, being replaced by trials that serve a similar purpose.

Once the player completes the goal of conquering all 8 Gyms (or all Trials) or if the player's Pokémon are strong enough, the player then learns more about the legend of the region and can open the opportunity to summon, battle, and catch the mascot Legendary Pokémon at a certain location. Additionally, completing the main storyline opens up other features in the games; this is primarily done by allowing passage into otherwise inaccessible places. Many games also have facilities dedicated to battling, such as the Battle Frontier, Battle Tower, and Battle Maison. Afterward, the game remains virtually open-ended, with the ultimate goal of the player being to obtain at least one member of each of the different species of Pokémon, thus completing the Pokédex.

Pokémon battles 

Battles between Pokémon are the central game mechanic of the Pokémon games. Within the game, they are used to train Pokémon to become stronger, earn prize money, and to progress through the game's story. Battles can also be done between players by connecting two game systems.

Pokémon uses a turn-based system. When the player challenges a Trainer or encounters a wild Pokémon, the screen changes to a battle scene displaying the player's Pokémon, the opposing Pokémon, their respective HP bars, and an options menu. The player may carry between one and six Pokémon in their active party; the first Pokémon in the lineup is automatically sent into battle. At the start of each turn, both sides may use a move, use an item, switch their active Pokémon out for another in their party, or attempt to flee from battle (only when battling a wild Pokémon; the player cannot flee from battles against other trainers). If both sides use a move, the Pokémon who acts first is determined by Speed, although some moves, items, and effects can override this. If either side chooses any other option, that action is performed before the attacks.

Each Pokémon uses moves to reduce their opponent's HP to zero, at which point the Pokémon faints and is unable to battle. When an opponent's Pokémon faints, the player's Pokémon receives experience points; when a Pokémon accumulates enough, then its level increases. If the player's Pokémon faints, they may select another Pokémon from their active party to battle; in battles against wild Pokémon, the player may attempt to flee instead. If all of a player's Pokémon faint, the player loses the battle. This causes the player to lose some money and return to the last Pokémon Center they visited.

Double and triple battles 
Pokémon Ruby and Sapphire introduced Double Battles, in which the opposing teams battle with two Pokémon at a time. Though the basic mechanics remain the same, certain moves may affect multiple targets at once, and some affect the ally as well as the opponents. Additionally, some Abilities work only in Double Battles. Multi Battles were also introduced, with four Trainers in teams of two. The third-generation games only included Double Battles against other Trainers, but Diamond and Pearl introduced Double Battles with wild Pokémon under certain circumstances.

Black and White also introduced Triple Battles and Rotation Battles. In Triple Battles, both teams send out three Pokémon at once, with all three battling simultaneously. In Rotation Battles, both sides send out three Pokémon at once, but only use one at a time. The Pokémon which is battling can be switched out with the other two without using up a turn.

Battle facilities 

In addition to the Pokémon Gyms and other battles to advance the plot, side games and post-game areas have been introduced in subsequent editions of the Pokémon games that extend the gameplay.

First introduced in Pokémon Crystal, the Battle Tower, Battle Subway, Battle Maison, and Battle Tree are game features accessible outside of the main storyline where the player faces several Trainers in succession with a limited set of their Pokémon and receive prizes in the form of otherwise rare items.

The Battle Frontier was introduced in Pokémon Emerald, replacing the Battle Tower as found in the Ruby and Sapphire games. In addition to having its own Battle Tower with the same rules as the previous ones, the Battle Frontier adds several other game mechanics that make battles unique in the end game. Examples include the Battle Palace's prohibition on choosing what moves the Pokémon uses and the Battle Factory's random rental Pokémon. Instead of prizes, the player is awarded Battle Points (BP) which can be traded for rare items or TMs. The Diamond and Pearl Battle Towers use this same system, and it is replaced by a Battle Frontier in Pokémon Platinum. The HeartGold and SoulSilver games also have a Battle Frontier, identical to that of the Platinum version, where the Battle Tower was found in Crystal. After a series of battles in each venue, players encounter Frontier Brains who are challenged in the same fashion as all other battles, and the player will either earn a Symbol (in Emerald) or a Commemorative Print (in Platinum) for winning. The Frontier Brains can be challenged a second time to more advanced versions of the Symbols or Prints (advancing from Silver to Gold). The Frontier Brains have very powerful Pokémon, often including Legendary Pokémon, making a victory even more difficult than in the main storyline.

Competitive play

Pokémon types 

A Pokémon's type is an elemental attribute determining the strengths and weaknesses of each Pokémon and its moves. These types interact in rock–paper–scissors-style relationships: Pokémon take double damage from attacking moves of types they are weak to and half damage from moves of types they resist.

In Pokémon Red, Green, Blue, and Yellow, there were only 15 types. The Dark and Steel types were introduced in Gold and Silver, and the Fairy type was introduced in X and Y. Some types have special properties unrelated to the damage chart; for example, Electric types are immune to being paralyzed.

When a Pokémon uses a move that rock–paper–scissors–style a 50% increase in power due to "STAB", a colloquial acronym for "same-type attack bonus".

Terastallization 
Pokémon Scarlet and Violet introduced Terastallization, which allows a Pokémon to change its type to match its "Tera Type" when activated, as well as giving the Pokémon a crystalline appearance. Terastallization also allows Pokémon to gain a STAB boost on moves of their Tera Type, while retaining STAB boost on moves of their original type(s). The move Tera Blast uniquely changes type to match a Pokémon's Tera Type while it is Terastallized, as well as dealing physical damage over special damage if the Pokémon's physical attack stat is higher. However, when not Terastallized, Tera Blast remains a Special category Normal-type move.

Pokémon moves 
Like the characters in many role-playing video games, Pokémon can learn a wide variety of moves. These moves may inflict damage, induce status problems, restore health, or perform actions that in some way affect the battle. The general strength of and resistance to these moves are determined by the various statistics a particular Pokémon has. All moves have power, accuracy and a number of Power Points (PP). Each move is also classified as one of the 18 Pokémon types. The moves that one Pokémon may learn are different from another depending on the species of Pokémon; even those that evolve from others do not necessarily learn all the same moves that their predecessors learn. Each Pokémon may only know a total of four moves at any one time. Moves may be learned through leveling up, using TMs and HMs, breeding and move tutors (NPCs that teach moves). In Pokémon Legends: Arceus, each move can be used in either "agile style" or "strong style". The agile style decreases accuracy, power, and effect duration while increasing the number of times players can move before the opponent can, and the strong style does the opposite.

Z-Moves 
Once per battle, if a Pokémon holds a Z-Crystal, a powerful object obtained from completing island trials, it can use an upgraded version of one of its moves, called a Z-Move. Z-Moves based on attacking moves tend to have much higher power than normal; those based on status moves usually incur a benefit on the user before executing the move. Some Pokémon can learn Z-Moves exclusive to their species using a special Z-Crystal.

Hidden Machines 
Hidden Machines, commonly abbreviated as HMs, can be used to teach moves to Pokémon, including some moves that they would otherwise not learn by increasing in level. HMs are often vital, or even required, to progress in the games, as they have important effects outside of battle, allowing the player to traverse certain obstacles. For example, Pokémon who learn the HM move Surf can transport the protagonist over water, which is necessary to reach island locations. When a Pokémon learns an HM move, the move cannot be deleted or replaced unless the player uses the services of an NPC known as the Move Deleter. HMs were eventually phased out in Pokémon Sun and Moon, being replaced by a variety of options unique to each game.

Pokémon abilities 
Pokémon Abilities are special attributes that were introduced in Pokémon Ruby and Sapphire. Specific species of Pokémon have one to three possible Abilities, with individual Pokémon exhibiting one Ability each. Unlike the moves a Pokémon knows, its Ability cannot normally change. Abilities can strengthen a Pokémon's statistics or weaken a foe, inflict status effects such as paralysis or poisoning, or perform other effects. Some Abilities may also grant immunities or resistances. Most Abilities can only be activated during a battle, however, some Abilities have effects outside of Pokémon battles. For example, a Pokémon with the Ability Intimidate will cause the player to encounter lower-level wild Pokémon less often.

Stats 
All Pokémon have six statistics that affect their performance in battle. These are HP, Attack, Defense, Special Attack, Special Defense, and Speed. These statistics can be temporarily modified during battle by Abilities, items, and moves.
 HP (short for Hit Points): A Pokémon faints when its HP reaches zero, and it cannot be used in battle again until it is revived at a Pokémon Center, or with a special item. However, they can still use moves in the field.
 Attack: Determines the strength of a Pokémon's physical attacks.
 Defense: Determines the Pokémon's resistance against physical attacks.
 Special Attack: Determines the power of a Pokémon's special attacks.
 Special Defense: Determines the Pokémon's resistance against special attacks.
 Speed: After battle commands are entered, the Speed statistics of the participating Pokémon are compared. With some exceptions, Pokémon with higher speeds make their moves before those with lower Speed. If two Pokémon have the same speed, through an algorithm called a random number generator, a Pokémon is chosen at random to go first.

There are also two other statistics, Accuracy and Evasiveness, which are not affected when Pokémon level up. No Pokémon has innately higher Accuracy or Evasiveness than any other, but they can be modified during battle like other statistics. Increasing Accuracy makes a move more likely to hit while increasing Evasiveness makes the opponent's move more likely to miss. A Pokémon's Accuracy, the opponent's Evasiveness, and the accuracy value of a given move affect the probability that the move will hit. Evasiveness was called "Evade" in the first generation and "Evasion" in the second.

Another stat called "Critical Hit Rate" also exists, and affects the chance that a Pokémon's moves will land a critical hit. This stat can only be raised, not lowered, and methods of changing it are much less common than methods to change the other 7 (not including HP) stats. 

In Pokémon Red, Green, Blue, and Yellow, both the Special Attack and Special Defense stats were a single stat, named the "Special" stat, which determined both powers with and resistance against special attacks.

When Pokémon level up, their statistics increase, as determined by the Pokémon's base stat values, effort values, Pokémon Nature, and individual values. These variables working in tandem provide each Pokémon with its unique stats.

Effort values 
Effort values, or EVs, are hidden values that affect the strengths of a Pokémon in particular statistical areas. Each Pokémon can be assigned 510 EVs, with a maximum of 252 EVs in a single stat. Pokémon can gain EVs with a variety of methods, like defeating other Pokémon or using "vitamins". Each Pokémon will give out one or more EVs in a specific stat corresponding to its species when defeated. Items can also affect a Pokémon's EVs, with vitamins being used to give a Pokémon 10 EVs in a single stat, and certain berries removing 10 EVs in a stat in return for an increase in the Pokémon's friendship value. Pokérus, a condition introduced in Pokémon Gold and Silver, increases the rate at which Pokémon gain EVs for a limited time, as well as giving the Pokémon the ability to spread Pokérus to other Pokémon.

Individual values 
Individual values, or IVs, are additional hidden values for each Pokémon that help to determine the stats of a Pokémon. Every Pokémon has IVs in every stat, ranging from 0 to 31. IVs can be inherited through breeding, as well as being randomly generated.

Battle mechanics

Mega Evolution 

Mega Evolution is a mechanic introduced in Pokémon X and Y, which further increases the abilities of specific Pokémon. If the player character possesses an item called the Key Stone and a Pokémon is holding a Mega Stone that corresponds to its species, that Pokémon will be able to Mega Evolve during battle. Each Pokémon is not given a mega evolution but some have. Every Pokémon capable of Mega Evolution has one Mega Evolved form, with the exception of Charizard and Mewtwo, both of which have two.

Primal Reversion is a mechanic introduced in Pokémon Omega Ruby and Alpha Sapphire, exclusively for the Legendary Pokémon Kyogre and Groudon. If the player gives the Blue Orb and the Red Orb to Kyogre and Groudon, respectively, the mechanic will take effect. After Kyogre and Groudon assume their Primal forms, they will each gain a new Ability, and Groudon will gain the Fire type. Kyogre will gain the Ability Primordial Sea, which will summon heavy rain, a special variation of the rain weather condition wherein all Fire-type moves are rendered useless. Groudon on the other hand gains Desolate Land, which summons extremely harsh sunlight, a special variation of harsh sunlight that makes Water-type moves fail. Unlike Mega Evolution, which can be performed only once per battle, Primal Reversion can be performed more than once, as Kyogre and Groudon will always be holding their respective orbs.

Dynamax 
Pokémon Sword and Shield introduced the Dynamax mechanic, which vastly increases a Pokémon's size and HP for three turns. While Dynamaxed, all of a Pokémon's moves get replaced with a corresponding "Max Move", which are not only more powerful but also has secondary effects, with the exception of Max Guard, which protects against all attacks. Certain Pokémon take on a different appearance when Dynamaxed, known as Gigantamaxing. Additionally, Gigantamaxed Pokémon gain access to special "G-Max Moves", which possess different secondary effects than those of typical Max Moves. There are 32 known species of Pokémon that can perform this transformation. Players can fight Dynamaxed Pokémon, as well as obtain Pokémon capable of Gigantamaxing, by participating in Max Raid Battles with other players.

Pokémon contests 
Contests are competitions for Pokémon in which they compete without battling. Pokémon contests have different rules. Pokémon contests have several different variants, such as being Coolness, Cuteness, Beauty, Cleverness, and Toughness.

Pokémon evolution 

Evolution is a sudden change in form of a Pokémon, usually accompanied by an increase in stat values. There are several different conditions that can trigger evolution in different species; the most common is gaining enough battle experience and leveling up. There are many other factors that can determine if, when, and into what, different Pokémon will evolve. The original alternate methods were the use of items called "evolutionary stones" or trading the Pokémon to another player. Later additions to the pool of conditions for evolution include dependence on the Pokémon's friendship level, the time of day in the game, carrying a unique item while being traded, the gender, or the area in the game where the Pokémon levels up.

Obtaining Pokémon

Starter Pokémon 
In each Pokémon game (with the exception of Pokémon Yellow, Let's Go, Pikachu!, and Let's Go, Eevee!), the player is presented with a choice of one of three starter Pokémon at the beginning of the game. Each starter Pokémon has a different type, being either Grass, Fire, or Water.

Catching Pokémon 

Catching is one of the most recognizable and important aspects of the Pokémon franchise. In most Pokémon games, players aim to weaken wild Pokémon in battle to then throw a Poké Ball. In Pokémon Go and the Pokémon: Let's Go! games, players catch Pokémon without battling them, instead throwing Poké Balls directly, sometimes aided by berries.

The  is a spherical device used by Pokémon Trainers to catch wild Pokémon. When a Poké Ball is thrown at a Pokémon, the Pokémon shrink themselves to fit inside of it.

Pokémon breeding 
Pokémon breeding was introduced in Pokémon Gold and Silver. Pokémon can be bred in-game at a Pokémon Day Care. These are businesses generally run by an elderly person or couple, which raise Trainers' Pokémon for a fee. If two compatible Pokémon are left there, they will eventually produce a Pokémon Egg, which the Trainer can pick up for free. After being carried by the Trainer for some distance, the Egg will hatch into a young Pokémon, usually of the lowest stage in its mother's evolutionary line.

Pokémon trades

Players have the ability to trade their Pokémon with one another by connecting two compatible games. Because of the Pokémon series revolving around catching as many Pokémon as possible, trading is considered an important aspect of Pokémon. Certain Pokémon are only able to evolve by trading, with the exception of Pokémon Legends: Arceus, where some of these Pokémon can evolve with the Linking Cord item. Other Pokémon require to be traded while holding an item to evolve, and Shelmet and Karrablast need to be traded with each other to evolve.

In certain games, the Global Trading System (GTS) is available, allowing players to place requests for a specific Pokémon in return for another Pokémon, able to be fulfilled by players across the world.

In other games, Wonder Trading (known in Sword and Shield as "Surprise Trading") is available, which allows a player to trade a Pokémon for a random Pokémon from another player who also attempted a Wonder Trade.

Distributions 

Certain Pokémon and items can be obtained through events. Mystery Gift, a feature introduced in Gold and Silver, allows players to receive in-game rewards during limited-time events. While some rewards are distributed with online serial codes or online functionality, others are exclusive to in-person events.

Shiny Pokémon 

 were first introduced in Gold and Silver as a way to demonstrate the new color capabilities of the Game Boy Color system. These are Pokémon that have a different coloration than normal; in earlier games, this was done by means of a palette swap. Encountering a Shiny Pokémon is extremely rare; the probability under normal conditions is 1 in 4,096 (1 in 8,192 prior to Pokémon X and Y). Some Pokémon, however, are coded never to be Shiny; this is known as being "Shiny-locked". Shiny-locked Pokémon cannot be caught in normal play, but they can be obtained in limited time events. For example, Zacian and Zamazenta could not be owned Shiny, but an event that started in Korea made it possible to obtain their Shiny forms via Mystery Gift.

Pokédex 
The  is an electronic device designed to catalog and provide information regarding the various species of Pokémon. The name Pokédex is a portmanteau of Pokémon and index. In the video games, whenever a Pokémon is first caught, its height, weight, species type, and a short description will be added to a player's Pokédex. Each region has its own Pokédex, which differs in appearance, species of Pokémon catalogued, and functions. In Pokémon Legends: Arceus, which takes place long before any other Pokémon games, players are tasked with assembling the first-ever Pokédex.

The National Pokédex allows Pokémon from all regions to be catalogued. After its removal from Pokémon Sword and Shield, many fans were upset, due to the lack of a National Pokédex meaning that not every Pokémon would be transferable to Sword and Shield. Although the National Pokédex returned in Brilliant Diamond and Shining Pearl, albeit only allowing Pokémon transferrable to the original Diamond and Pearl games, it has remained absent in non-remakes.

Pokémon storage

Pokémon Bank and Poké Transporter 
 is an application which allows players to store up to 3,000 Pokémon in an online cloud storage service. Players can deposit and withdraw Pokémon from both physical and downloaded versions of compatible games, allowing players to exchange Pokémon between the two versions without the need for a second system. Additionally, an application called the  allows players to upload Pokémon from Pokémon Black, White, Black 2 and White 2 to the Pokémon Bank, after which they can be imported into newer games. The service requires an annual subscription fee and there are plans to continue to utilize it for future Pokémon titles.

Intended for release on December 27, 2013, Pokémon Bank was postponed due to unforeseen traffic levels on the Nintendo Network service. Pokémon Bank was fully released on the Nintendo eShop on January 22, 2014, in Japan, February 4, 2014, in Europe and February 5, 2014, in North America.

As of an update released on January 24, 2017, Pokémon Sun and Moon became compatible Pokémon Bank. The update allows players to transfer and deposit their Pokémon between Bank and Sun and Moon, though when transferred, they cannot return to the older games. Additionally, the Poké Transporter was also updated to allow players to transfer Pokémon caught in the Virtual Console editions of Pokémon Red, Blue and Yellow to Pokémon Sun and Moon. The update also added a new in-app National Pokédex, presumably to make up for the lack of one in Sun and Moon.

Pokémon Home 

On May 28, 2019, Pokémon Home was revealed as the successor to Pokémon Bank. It released in February 2020 on iOS, Android, and the Nintendo Switch. Similarly to Bank, it allows for cloud storage of Pokémon, and is able to interact with Bank, Pokémon Go, and all main series Pokémon games on the Nintendo Switch. Also similar to Bank is the subscription model, in which users can access a limited set of features and store up to 30 Pokémon for free, though they can access the full set of features and store up to 6,000 Pokémon with the "Premium Plan". The different versions of Pokémon Home have multiple exclusive features, such as the mobile version offering the ability to trade Pokémon with other users.

Notes

References 

Pokémon video games
Pokémon